The 51st Bombardment Squadron is an inactive United States Air Force unit.  It was last assigned to the 68th Bombardment Wing at Seymour Johnson Air Force Base, North Carolina, where it was inactivated on 30 September 1982.

The squadron was first activated in 1947 in the reserve as the 51st Reconnaissance Squadron.  It does not appear to have been fully manned or equipped before it was inactivated in the 1949 military budget cuts.  It was reactivated as part of Strategic Air Command as the 68th Strategic Reconnaissance Squadron, but soon converted to the strategic bomber mission.  It continued this mission with Boeing B-47 Stratojet Stratojets and Boeing B-52 Stratofortresses until inactivating 30 years later.

History

Air Force reserve
The 51st Bombardment activated in the reserve in 1947 as a Continental Air Command weather reconnaissance squadron at Hamilton AFB.  It later flew long-range strategic reconnaissance flights.   The squadron was later inactivated in 1949 a result of budget reductions.

Strategic Air Command

Chennault Air Force Base
It was reactivated in 1951 as a Strategic Reconnaissance squadron; however it had few personnel.   The squadron received second-line RB-29 Superfortresses in May 1952, remaining in a second-line status with this equipment until 1953 when the squadron was brought up to full personnel strength and received new B-47 Stratojet bombers. Becoming operationally ready with the B-47 in May 1954, the 51 Bombardment squadron conducted strategic bombardment training and air refueling to meet SAC's global commitments.  The B-47s were reassigned in late 1962 from Chennault AFB when it was decided close the base and the squadron placed on inactive status.

Seymour Johnson Air Force Base
It was reorganized on 15 Apr 1963 as a B-52G Stratofortress Squadron, receiving equipment and personnel from the inactivating 73d Bombardment Squadron.  The squadron conducted strategic bombardment training and global refueling operations to meet SAC commitments. Aircraft, most aircrews and maintenance personnel, and other support personnel were loaned to other SAC units for combat operations in Southeast Asia, 27 May 1972 – 15 July 1973.

The squadron returned to nuclear alert after the end of the Vietnam War, but was inactivated as a result of the retirement of the B-52Gs in 1982.

Lineage
 Constituted as the 51st Reconnaissance Squadron, Very Long Range, Weather in 1947
 Activated on 1 August 1947
 Inactivated on 27 June 1949
 Redesignated 51st Strategic Reconnaissance Squadron, Medium (Photographic) on 4 October 1951
 Activated on 10 October 1951
 Redesignated 51st Bombardment Squadron, Medium on 16 June 1952
 Redesignated 51st Bombardment Squadron, Heavy on 15 April 1963
 Inactivated on 30 September 1982

Assignments
 68th Reconnaissance Group, 1 August 1947 – 27 June 1949
 68th Strategic Reconnaissance Group, 10 August 1951 (attached to 68th Strategic Reconnaissance Wing after 10 October 1951)
 68th Strategic Reconnaissance Wing (later 68th Bombardment Wing), 16 June 1952 – 30 September 1982

Stations
 Hamilton Field (later Hamilton Air Force Base), California, 9 Apr 1947 – 27 Jun 1949
 Lake Charles Air Force Base (later Chennault Air Fore Base), Louisiana, 10 Oct 1951
 Seymour Johnson Air Force Base, North Carolina, 15 Apr 1963 – 30 Sep 1982

Aircraft
 Boeing RB-29 Superfortress, 1951-1952
 Boeing B-47 Stratojet Stratojet, 1953–1963
 Boeing B-52 Stratofortress, 1963–1982

See also
 List of B-52 Units of the United States Air Force

References

Notes

Bibliography

External links

051
051